Goshpi Avari is a Pakistani Asian Games gold medalist in sailing. She won the medal with her husband, Byram, at the 1982 Games. She was the first and, until 2010, the only Pakistani woman to have won a gold medal at a major international competition.

Family
Avari is married to Byram and the couple have three children together, including Xerxes, also an Asian Games competitor for Pakistan. She is Parsi.

Sailing
Avari won a gold medal in enterprise class yachting at the 1982 Asian Games in New Delhi, India, where she was the only female competitor in the sport.

Awards
 Pride of Performance (2011)

References

Living people
Parsi people
Pakistani female sailors (sport)
Pakistani Zoroastrians
Recipients of the Pride of Performance
Sportspeople from Karachi
Asian Games medalists in sailing
Sailors at the 1982 Asian Games
Medalists at the 1982 Asian Games
Asian Games gold medalists for Pakistan
Year of birth missing (living people)